The Bully Fire was a wildfire that started on July 11, 2014 at 3:37 PM PDT in Shasta County. A couple of days later, the Bully Fire reached , but the containment also increased to 45%. During the next few days, containment gradually increased to 95%, before progress stalled on July 22. However, the increase in containment allowed the road closures and the evacuation orders to be lifted. During the next 4 days, firefighting efforts continued to slowly extinguish the Bully Fire, until full containment of the perimeter was achieved on July 26, at 8:00 PM PDT. Fire patrols lingered for the next couple of days to work on extinguishing the blaze, and on July 28, the Bully Fire was reported to be 100% controlled.

During its duration, the Bully Fire destroyed a total of 20 residential structures. A total of 21 injuries and 1 death were also reportedly caused by the fire, which was determined to be human-caused.

In 2016, Freddie Alexander Smoke III was arrested by police in Indiana and extradited to Shasta County. He pled no contest to charges of arson and involuntary manslaughter, and was sentenced to five years in prison and restitution.

References

2014 California wildfires
Wildfires in Shasta County, California
July 2014 events in the United States
California wildfires caused by arson